The men's 200 metre backstroke competition of the swimming events at the 1971 Pan American Games took place on 8 August.  The last Pan American Games champion was Ralph Hutton of Canada.

This race consisted of four lengths of the pool, all in backstroke.

Results
All times are in minutes and seconds.

Heats

Final 
The final was held on August 8.

References

Swimming at the 1971 Pan American Games